Koome is an island in Lake Victoria, Uganda.

Location
Koome Island is located in Mukono District, in northwestern Lake Victoria, in Uganda. The island is separated to Ssese Islands by the Koome Channel. Koome is the largest island in the northeastern group. Other islands in the same group include: Damba Island, Lwaje Island, Ngamba-Chimpanzee Island, Bulago Island, Kayaga Island and others.
 The coordinates of Koome Island are:00 05 06S, 32 45 00E (Latitude:-0.0850; Longitude:32.7500).

Urban areas
The largest urban area on the island is called Bugombe, located on the northwestern shore of the island. There is a health center on the island, Koome Health Center III, not far from Bugombe. In February 2011, PostBank Uganda announced that they will soon open a brick and mortar branch on Koome Island.

Economic activities
The principal economic activity on Koome, as is the case with most adjacent islands in the Ssese Islands is fishing. Nile Perch is the species primarily fished, with most of the catch processed on the mainland for export. Overfishing is a concern. Other economic activities include agriculture, both crop and animal husbandry, logging and tourism.

See also
 Ssese Islands
 Kalangala District
 Lake Victoria
 Central Region, Uganda

References

External links
 Map of Koome Island At Google Maps

Mukono District
Lake islands of Uganda
Islands of Lake Victoria